Adonis Amaya (born November 10, 1996) is an American soccer player who currently plays for San Diego 1904 FC in the National Independent Soccer Association.

Early life and education 
Amaya was born November 10, 1996.  He played Varsity   soccer  at Westminster High School. He graduated and later attended college at the University of California, Santa Barbara after being recruited to play college soccer for the UC Santa Barbara Gauchos men's soccer team, but ultimately never featured for the Gauchos.

Career

Professional
On March 19, 2015, Amaya signed a professional contract with LA Galaxy II, a USL affiliate club of LA Galaxy.  He made his professional debut three days later in a 0–0 draw against Real Monarchs SLC.

International
Amaya has also represented the United States in the U17 level.

References

External links
USSF Development Academy bio

1996 births
Living people
American soccer players
LA Galaxy II players
Association football forwards
Soccer players from California
People from Westminster, California
USL Championship players
National Independent Soccer Association players
United States men's youth international soccer players
American sportspeople of Salvadoran descent
Sportspeople from Orange County, California